The Lisa McPherson Trust was an organisation created in 1999 by Bob Minton. The trust was named after Lisa McPherson, a Scientology member who died in 1995 after being in the Church of Scientology’s care for 17 days. Their stated goal was to "expose the deceptive and abusive practices of Scientology and help those victimized by [the Church of Scientology]."

Of the five staff members at the Lisa McPherson trust, four were former members of Scientology.

History

Bob Minton learned of the Church of Scientology's attempt to shut down the Internet newsgroup alt.religion.scientology. Minton was an advocate of free speech on the Internet and a member of the Electronic Frontier Foundation, and was alarmed at the Church's strong-arm tactics against its opponents, including raiding their homes and confiscating computer equipment over alleged copyright infringement for publishing documents on the Internet.

Staff 

The LMT staff included Stacy Brooks (President), Jesse Prince (Vice-President), Teresa Summers (Vice-President), Mark Bunker (Videographer), Jeff Jacobsen (Librarian), Robert Peterson (Office Manager), and Ingrid Wagner (Reception).

Controversy

Location

The company's headquarters were located in downtown Clearwater, Florida. Many property managers denied the group access to their buildings after being contacted by members of Scientology. Scientology offered to buy the building out from Minton but the property manager declined.

Picketing

The company frequently engaged in pickets in downtown Clearwater. On the anniversary of Lisa McPherson’s death in 1999, the group used a projector to beam a message on the side of the Fort Harrison Hotel which read: "Lisa McPherson: We will never forget you." An injunction was quickly sought against the group and a no-picket zone was established in front of Scientology buildings.

In 2001 this injunction was expanded by a county judge. The new order prevented either side from yelling, shouting, whistling, singing, blowing a horn whistle or other noisemaker, or otherwise creating noise which would disturb "reasonable persons of ordinary sensibilities." It also expanded the no-picket zone to include the area across the street from Scientology's dining hall.

The new order also required trust members to inform the police of any picket an hour in advance of the event.

To enforce this ruling, Clearwater city painted two white lines across Watterson Avenue, stating that while Scientologists were loading or unloading buses in the area, the trust staff and members could not enter it.

Legal problems

In late 2001, Scientology named the Lisa McPherson Trust as co-defendants in a case they had brought against the estate of Lisa McPherson.

For-profit status

Bob Minton claimed that the trust had a for-profit status to allow them to hide financial and other records from the Church of Scientology. Scientologists claimed that the for-profit status was proof that the group was created in order to allow Minton to recuperate the almost $2.5 million that he had put towards creating the group.

Reaction from the Church of Scientology

The Church vehemently opposed the creation of the trust. They levelled many accusations against it including allegations that the trust was violently attempting to deprogram ex-Scientologists.

Closure of the trust

The trust was disbanded in November 2001. Minton cited mounting legal pressure from Scientology as the official reason. The closure of the trust was delayed for some months as a judge ordered that Scientology could conduct an official review of all of the Trust’s records. This included phone records and financial records which were later produced in court.

In 2006, Bob Minton signed over the ownership of the building at 33 N Ft. Harrison Ave, Clearwater to the Church of Scientology.

References

External links
The Lisa McPherson Trust from Operation Clambake
Former webpage from Archive.org
Mirror of the site

Clearwater, Florida
Critics of Scientology
Defunct organizations based in Florida
Organizations based in Florida